The Red Pony is a  1933 novella by John Steinbeck.

The Red Pony may also refer to:

The Red Pony, Henry Standing Bear's bar in the TV series Longmire
 The Red Pony (1949 film), an adaptation of Steinbeck's novella
 The Red Pony (Copland), a musical score composed by Aaron Copland for the film
 The Red Pony (1973 film), a TV film adaptation of the novella
 Red Pony Records, a record label founded by 80s country music singer Sylvia